Sten Ove Filip Tjernberg (27 December 1928 – 7 March 2001) was a Swedish actor. He was engaged at Gothenburg City Theatre.

Selected filmography 

1996 - Jägarna
1994 - Läckan (TV)
1982 - Polisen som vägrade svara (TV)
1973 - Någonstans i Sverige (TV)
1973 - Den vita stenen (TV)
1965 - Nattcafé (TV film)
1965 - Morianna

External links 

 
 Swedish Film Database

1928 births
2001 deaths
20th-century Swedish male actors
Swedish male film actors
Swedish male stage actors
Swedish male television actors
People from Uppsala